Alex Paez (born July 25, 1963) is an American actor, musician and restaurateur.

Career 
Paez began his career in 1971 appearing in various TV commercials. In 1979, he received a Best Actor Emmy Award for his performances in Unicorn Tales, a series of mini-musicals for NBC. The following year brought a second nomination in the same category for the NBC Special Treat presentation: “NYC Too Far From Tampa Blues.”
 
In 1980 he was cast as Prince Choi Amid Sin Du in the Garry Marshall pilot “Kat Mandu” starring Vicki Lawrence, Alice Ghostly and Victor Buono, and he played a young mugger in CBSʼ “Stone Pillow” opposite Lucille Ball.

In 1987 he made his Broadway debut as Momo (Mohammed) at the Royale Theater in Hal Princeʼs musical Roza. The show played to mixed reviews in both Baltimore and Los Angeles, but closed shortly after opening in New York.

In 1991 he took over the role of Ritchie Valens in the national tour of Buddy – The Buddy Holly Story.  He later relocated to London to play the role in the West End. While there he met and married his wife, Helen.
 
After relocating to Los Angeles, the roles offered changed, and Paez played such parts as: the good guy, the Detective, the Politician, and the occasional Military Man in such shows as: NYPD Blue, The District, Charmed, The West Wing, Monk, CSI: Miami, Commander In Chief, Boston Legal and various movies of the week and mini-series, including A Gunfighter's Pledge and Meteor.

Filmography

References

External links
 
 Official website (archived copy)

1963 births
Living people
Place of birth missing (living people)
American male actors
American restaurateurs